Ruotsinpyhtää is a former municipality of Finland. Ruotsinpyhtää, Pernå and Liljendal were consolidated to Loviisa on January 1, 2010.

It is located in the province of Southern Finland and was part of the Eastern Uusimaa region (now Uusimaa).

The municipality was bilingual, with majority being Finnish and minority Swedish speakers.

History
The area of Ruotsinpyhtää was originally part of Pyhtää. After the Treaty of Åbo in 1743 the border between Sweden and Russian Empire was drawn on the Ahvenkoski rapid, dividing Pyhtää between the two states. Due to this the western side became known as Ruotsinpyhtää (Swedish Pyhtää). In 1744 Jakob Forsell (later af Forselles) and Anders Nohrström bought the local ironworks, which was renamed Strömfors after their surnames. In 1817 Strömfors became the official Swedish name for the municipality.

The Ruotsinpyhtää church was built in 1771 from wood. The church was renovated in 1898 to its current gothic revival appearance.

People born in Ruotsinpyhtää
 Carl Axel Gottlund (1796–1875)
 Gustaf Mickels (1879–1949)
 Henrik Kullberg (1891–1953)
 Sylvi Siltanen (1909–1986)
 Pamela Tola (1981–)
 Toni Lindberg (1985–)

See also 
 Virginia af Forselles

References

External links

Populated coastal places in Finland
Former municipalities of Finland
Loviisa
Populated places established in 1743
Populated places disestablished in 2010
1743 establishments in Sweden